In mathematical economics, Topkis's theorem is a result that is useful for establishing comparative statics.  The theorem allows researchers to understand how the optimal value for a choice variable changes when a feature of the environment changes.  The result states that if f is supermodular in (x,θ), and D is a lattice, then  is nondecreasing in θ.  The result is especially helpful for establishing comparative static results when the objective function is not differentiable. The result is named after Donald M. Topkis.

An example
This example will show how using Topkis's theorem gives the same result as using more standard tools.  The advantage of using Topkis's theorem is that it can be applied to a wider class of problems than can be studied with standard economics tools.

A driver is driving down a highway and must choose a speed, s. Going faster is desirable, but is more likely to result in a crash. There is some prevalence of potholes, p. The presence of potholes increases the probability of crashing. Note that s is a choice variable and p is a parameter of the environment that is fixed from the perspective of the driver.

We would like to understand how the driver's speed (a choice variable) changes with the amount of potholes: 

If one wanted to solve the problem with standard tools such as the implicit function theorem, one would have to assume that the problem is well behaved: U(.) is twice continuously differentiable, concave in s, that the domain over which s is defined is convex, and that it there is a unique maximizer  for every value of p and that  is in the interior of the set over which s is defined.  Note that the optimal speed is a function of the amount of potholes.  Taking the first order condition, we know that at the optimum, .  Differentiating the first order condition, with respect to p and using the implicit function theorem, we find that
  
or that 

 

So, 

If s and p are substitutes, 

 

and hence 

and more potholes causes less speeding.  Clearly it is more reasonable to assume that they are substitutes.

The problem with the above approach is that it relies on the differentiability of the objective function and on concavity. We could get at the same answer using Topkis's theorem in the following way. Note that the choice set is clearly a lattice. The cross partial of U being negative, is a sufficient condition. Hence if  we know that .

Hence using the implicit function theorem and Topkis's theorem gives the same result, but the latter does so with fewer assumptions.

Notes and references

Comparative statics
Economics theorems
Theorems in lattice theory
Order theory
Optimization of ordered sets
Supermodular functions